Jordan Township is an inactive township in Ripley County, in the U.S. state of Missouri.

Jordan Township was erected in 1871, and named after the local Jordan family.

References

Townships in Missouri
Townships in Ripley County, Missouri